Gallen may refer to:

Places
 Gallen (barony), a barony in Ireland
 Sankt Gallen (disambiguation), various locations in German-speaking countries

People
 Saint Gall, Irish missionary, Sankt Gallus in German
 Conal Gallen, Irish singer/comedian
 Herbert Gallen (1915–2007), US fashion businessman
 Hugh Gallen (1924–82), Governor of New Hampshire, USA
 James Gallen, politician in Pennsylvania, USA
 Jarl Gallén (1908–90), Finnish historian
 Joel Gallen, U.S. filmmaker
 Kevin Gallen (b. 1975), English association footballer
 Laurie Gallen (b. 1962), New Zealand field hockey player
 Paul Gallen (b. 1981), Australian rugby league player
 Ricardo Gallén (b. 1972), Spanish classical guitar player
 Zac Gallen (b. 1995), American baseball player
 Gallen Lo (b. 1962), Hong Kong actor
 Gallen-Kallela, Finnish surname

See also
 Galen
 Gallon
 Galena
 Gallienus
 Gallen-Kallela